Ovidiu Buidoșo (born 13 July 1987) is a Romanian gymnast. He competed at the 2012 Summer Olympics.

References

External links
 

1987 births
Living people
Romanian male artistic gymnasts
Olympic gymnasts of Romania
Gymnasts at the 2012 Summer Olympics
People from Dubăsari District, Transnistria